In the 1915 season of the Campeonato Paulista, two championships were disputed, each by a different league.

APSA Championship 

The APSA-organized Campeonato Paulista started with the same participants as last year. Shortly after the beginning of the championship, Corinthians left LPF and attempted to join APSA, and although nominally accepted in the league, it wasn't a full member and couldn't take part in the championship, and as such, the team was only allowed to friendlies that year. At the end of the championship, AA das Palmeiras won its 3rd title. the top scorer was AA das Palmeiras's Carlos Nazareth with 13 goals.

System
The championship was disputed in a double-round robin system, with the team with the most points winning the title.

Championship

LPF Championship

The edition of the 1915 Campeonato Paulista organized by the LPF (Liga Paulista de Football) ended with Germânia winning the title for the 2nd time. the top scorer was Campos Elyseos's Facchini with 17 goals.

System
The championship was disputed in a double-round robin system, with the team with the most points winning the title.

Championship

References

Campeonato Paulista seasons
Paulista